Band-e Chay (also Romanized as Band-e Chāy and Band Chā’ī; also known as Bandchāl) is a village in Nur Ali Beyk Rural District, in the Central District of Saveh County, Markazi Province, Iran. At the 2006 census, its population was 410, in 114 families.

References 

Populated places in Saveh County